Ilbono (Irbono in Sardinian language) is a comune (municipality) in the Province of Nuoro in the Italian region Sardinia, located about  northeast of Cagliari and about  southwest of Tortolì. Its economy is based heavily on heavy industry.

Ilbono borders the following municipalities: Arzana, Bari Sardo, Elini, Lanusei, Loceri, Tortolì.

References

Cities and towns in Sardinia